Sardar Inder Singh (1890–1983) was the leading Sikh Indian industrialist from the 50s till his death in 1983. He founded the Steel re rolling industry in India by installing India's First steel re rolling mill, Singh Engineering Works, Kanpur. He went on to set up many industrial units and diversified by setting North India's largest railway wagon factory, Singh Wagon Factory and becoming the largest producer and supplier of Tie Bars to the Indian Railways. He was founder member and President of Merchants Chamber Of UP and Chairman, Employers Association of Northern India. He was an MLA from Amritsar from 1946 to 1961 and MP, Rajya Sabha.

The 2018 film Raid is based on a raid carried out against him.

References

Indian National Congress politicians
Indian National Congress politicians from Punjab, India
1890 births
1983 deaths